Lieutenant-General James Steven Lucas, CMM, CD (born 24 February 1952) is a retired Canadian air force general who was Chief of the Air Staff in Canada from 2005 to 2007.

Career
Educated at John Taylor Collegiate in Winnipeg, Lucas joined the Canadian Forces in 1969 and graduated from the Canadian Forces Air Navigation School in 1974. He became Commanding Officer of 435 Transport Squadron in July 1989, Commander of CFB Goose Bay in 1990 and Director of Joint Requirements at the National Defence Headquarters in 1994. He went on to be Director of Aerospace Planning Coordination in 1996, and then joined the staff at 1 Canadian Air Division Headquarters in Summer 1997. After that he became Commander of 1 Canadian Air Division / Canadian NORAD Region in 2000, Chief of Staff Joint Force Generation in 2003 and Chief of the Air Staff in 2005 before retiring in 2007.

References

|-

|-

1952 births
Living people
Canadian Forces Air Command generals
Commanders of the Order of Military Merit (Canada)
Military personnel from Toronto